The first round of the 2021 Croatian local elections were held on 16 May and the second round, where necessary, on 30 May. All seats of the county prefects, city and municipal mayors and members of county, municipal and city councils were up for election.

In total, there were 8,216 open seats to be contested by 38,223 candidates. Voters elected 20 county prefects, 128 city mayors, 428 municipal mayors and 7,640 others for positions of deputy county prefects, deputy city mayors, deputy municipal mayors, deputy city and municipal mayors elected by the national minorities, county councilors, city councilors and municipal councilors. About 3,660,000 voters had the right to vote.

Before the elections were even held, the outcome was already settled in five towns including Hrvatska Kostajnica, Nin, Novigrad, Pakrac and Skradin, as well as 66 municipalities, because there was only one candidate.

Election results

Counties

Cities

Elections in major cities
2021 Zagreb local elections
2021 Split local elections
2021 Rijeka local elections
2021 Osijek local elections
2022 Split local elections

References

2021 elections in Croatia
2021
May 2021 events in Croatia